Remungol is a former commune in the Morbihan department of Brittany in north-western France. Inhabitants of Remungol are called in French Remungolais.

History 
On 1 January 2016, Moustoir-Remungol, Naizin and Remungol merged becoming one commune called Évellys.

Geography
The Ével flows southwestward through the northern part of the commune, then forms its south-western border.

See also
Communes of the Morbihan department

References

External links

Former communes of Morbihan